The 2003–04 Ranji Trophy was the 70th season of the Ranji Trophy. Mumbai defeated Tamil Nadu on first innings lead. Maharashtra won the Plate division title.

Wasim Jaffer of Mumbai took 23 catches in nine matches which is the record for most catches in a season by a fielder.

Group Matches

Elite Group

Group A

  Mumbai and Railways qualified for the Elite Group knockout stage.

Group B

  Tamil Nadu and Hyderabad qualified for the Elite Group knockout stage.

Knockout stage

Final

Scorecards and averages
Cricketarchive

References

2004 in Indian cricket
Ranji Trophy seasons
Domestic cricket competitions in 2003–04